In Hungary, a 5-point grade system is used. There are only whole numbers in report cards, but for grading exams, there are also fractions (such as 3/4, which is between 3 and 4). Some teachers use lines above (rarely) or under (more commonly) the numbers to draw a clearer distinction: e.g., 4- is worse than a 4 but better than a 3, a 3' (3-plus), or a 3/4 (3 < 3' < 3/4 < 4, < 4); sometimes they even use multiple lines. 

For unusually good performance, the grade 5* can be awarded, but is less frequently used in secondary schools. 1 is the only failing grade. When grading a student's attitude or diligence, only the grades 2-5 are used.

References
  Hungarian Grading System Grading System in Hungary

Hungary
Grading
Academia in Hungary